"Mother" is a song by Pink Floyd. It appears on The Wall album, released in 1979.

Composition
"Mother" is 5:32 in length. The majority of the song is in G major, though the chorus is predominantly a plagal cadence in C major. The song is notable for its varied use of time signatures, such as 5/8 and 9/8. Pink Floyd drummer Nick Mason found these time-signature changes difficult to learn, and, with the band recording on a very tight schedule, ceded the drumming duties to session drummer Jeff Porcaro.

The song begins quietly with solo voice and a single acoustic guitar, and gradually expands its instrumentation to include, by song's end, reed organ, piano, drums, electric bass, and electric guitar. The song has a short introduction, consisting only of a sharp inhalation and rapid exhalation before the first verses are sung by Roger Waters. The verse timing progression is: 5/8 - 8/8 × 4 - 5/8 - 8/8 × 8 - 6/8 - 8/8 × 2 - 5/8 - 8/8 × 4 - 5/8 - 8/8 × 8 - 6/8 - 8/8 × 3.

The chorus, sung by David Gilmour, starts on two measures of 4/4 before going into 6/8 (or "compound duple meter") for most of the chorus, in a narrative response to the first set of lyrics. There is also one measure of 9/8. A guitar solo follows over a chord progression in 4/4 time. Waters sings another verse, which is once more followed by Gilmour's chorus (with different lyrics). Finally, the song concludes with an arrangement stripped back down to one acoustic guitar and Waters's voice, and a ritardando in which Waters sings, "Mother, did it need to be so high?", a reference to the metaphorical wall constructed by the character Pink. The song ends on the subdominant, C major, which may create an "unfinished" or "dissatisfying" feeling.

Waters explained to Mojo magazine that the song is about "the idea that we can be controlled by our parents' views on things like sex. The single mother of boys, particularly, can make sex harder than it needs to be." "Most of the songs I've written have always followed the lyrics," he noted. "I've often tailored the music to fit the words, especially something like 'Money' or 'Mother'."

Plot
The Wall tells the story of Pink, an embittered and alienated rock star. As told through the song "Mother", part of Pink's sense of alienation comes from being raised by an overprotective single mother, who lost her husband, Pink's father, in World War II. The song narrates a conversation by Pink (voiced by Waters) and his mother (voiced by Gilmour). The listener learns of the overprotectiveness of Pink's mother, who is helping Pink build his wall to try to protect him from the outside world, evidenced by the line "Of course Momma's gonna help build the wall," spoken by Pink's mother. She insists that Pink stay by her side even after he grows up, and cannot stand it when Pink eventually grows older and falls in love.

Film version
For the film, the song was re-recorded completely with the exception of David Gilmour's guitar solo. One line of the lyrics, "Is it just a waste of time", became "Mother, am I really dying", as the original LP lyrics read. This change ties in with a brief subplot in the film where Pink contracts a fever after caring for a sick rat that died from it.

Personnel
David Gilmour – vocals (chorus), high strung acoustic guitars, electric guitar
Roger Waters – vocals (verse), acoustic guitar, bass guitar
with:

Bob Ezrin – harmonium, Hammond organ, piano
Jeff Porcaro – drums

Personnel per Fitch and Mahon.

Cover versions

One of the most prominent covers of this song was done by Pearl Jam on the show - Late Night with Jimmy Fallon. This performance marked the end of The Pink Floyd Week celebrated on the show as a tribute to Pink Floyd.

For the 1990 The Wall – Live in Berlin concert, vocals by Sinéad O'Connor backed by Rick Danko & Levon Helm, accordion by Garth Hudson, acoustic instruments by The Hooters + Roger Waters and many others.

In 2003, A Fair Forgery of Pink Floyd, a tribute album of Pink Floyd covers was released; it included a version of "Mother" by Quetzal called by AllMusic a "heart-ripping country rendition", and featuring a cajón, an accordion, and a violin solo.

Natalie Maines covered "Mother" for her 2013 album, also titled Mother. According to critic Ann Powers, Maines' "interpretation of Roger Waters's lyrics helps the original becomes something new — something bigger".

Amanda Palmer released her cover of the song, orchestrated by Jherek Bischoff, on November 15, 2017. The accompanying video was funded by her Patreon subscribers. She dedicated the song and music video to "the current administration". The single features a cello solo by Zoë Keating. The video was directed by Jordan Rathus.

In the final episode of the FX cable TV series, Legion, "Mother" was sung by Dan Stevens (as David Haller) and Stephanie Corneliussen (as Gabrielle Xavier).

Further reading
 Fitch, Vernon. The Pink Floyd Encyclopedia (3rd edition), 2005. .

References

External links

1979 songs
Pink Floyd songs
Rock ballads
Songs about mothers
Songs written by Roger Waters
Song recordings produced by Bob Ezrin
Song recordings produced by David Gilmour
Song recordings produced by Roger Waters
Songs about childhood